West Park is a census-designated place in Fresno County, California. West Park's population is 1,157.

Demographics
At the 2010 census West Park had a population of 1,157. The racial makeup of West Park was 602 (52.0%) White, 32 (2.8%) African American, 32 (2.8%) Native American, 54 (4.7%) Asian, 1 (0.1%) Pacific Islander, 370 (32.0%) from other races, and 66 (5.7%) from two or more races. Hispanic or Latino of any race were 879 people (76.0%).

The whole population lived in households, no one lived in non-institutionalized group quarters and no one was institutionalized.

There were 294 households, 153 (52.0%) had children under the age of 18 living in them, 150 (51.0%) were opposite-sex married couples living together, 53 (18.0%) had a female householder with no husband present, 34 (11.6%) had a male householder with no wife present.  There were 28 (9.5%) unmarried opposite-sex partnerships, and 0 (0%) same-sex married couples or partnerships. 47 households (16.0%) were one person and 18 (6.1%) had someone living alone who was 65 or older. The average household size was 3.94.  There were 237 families (80.6% of households); the average family size was 4.29.

The age distribution was 381 people (32.9%) under the age of 18, 116 people (10.0%) aged 18 to 24, 296 people (25.6%) aged 25 to 44, 254 people (22.0%) aged 45 to 64, and 110 people (9.5%) who were 65 or older.  The median age was 29.8 years. For every 100 females, there were 111.5 males.  For every 100 females age 18 and over, there were 111.4 males.

There were 328 housing units at an average density of ,of which 294 were occupied, 174 (59.2%) by the owners and 120 (40.8%) by renters.  The homeowner vacancy rate was 1.7%; the rental vacancy rate was 6.2%.  624 people (53.9% of the population) lived in owner-occupied housing units and 533 people (46.1%) lived in rental housing units.

References

Census-designated places in Fresno County, California
Census-designated places in California